Ferdinando Apap (born 29 July 1992) is a Maltese international footballer who plays for Hibernians as a defender.

Career
Apap has played club football for Għajnsielem, Sheffield, Mosta, Xewkija Tigers and Victoria Hotspurs. On 1 June 2019, he officially joined Hibernians on a three-year deal.

He made his international debut for Malta in August 2018.

Personal life
His sister was married to Daniel Bogdanović, also a footballer.

References

1992 births
Living people
Maltese footballers
Malta international footballers
Għajnsielem F.C. players
Sheffield F.C. players
Mosta F.C. players
Xewkija Tigers F.C. players
Victoria Hotspurs F.C. players
Hibernians F.C. players
Maltese Premier League players
Association football defenders
Maltese expatriate footballers
Maltese expatriate sportspeople in England
Expatriate footballers in England